Vasanthamalika is a 2003 Indian Malayalam-language comedy-drama film directed by Suresh Krishnan and written by Mahesh Mithra. It stars Mukesh, Jagadish, and Uma Shankari. It is a remake of the Tamil film Budget Padmanabhan. This was Arun Kumar Aravind's first film as an editor.

Cast
 Mukesh as Balakrishnan a.k.a. Balu, a garment worker
 Uma Shankari as Nandini, the managing director's daughter
 Jagathy Sreekumar as Bodheswaran
 Kavilraj as College student
 Sai Kumar as Varadharaja settu
 Bindu Panicker as Anandavalli
 Sreenath as Balakrishnan father
 Kalarenjini as Lekshmiamma mother of Balakrishnan
 Nadirshah as Abhilash
 Master Arun as a Child of Kulappura veedu
 Salim Kumar as Komalan
 Jagadeesh as Mumbai Madhavan

Production
Biju Menon was initially supposed to play one of the lead roles. Uma Shankari, who made her Malayalam debut in Kuberan, was cast as the heroine.

Soundtrack
 Ennum Palavidha M.G.Sreekumar
 Koomanum Kurumanum M.G. Sreekumar
 Manassinullil Mayangi M.G. Sreekumar
 Poomukhathoro M.G. Sreekumar
 Sightadikkana K.S. Chitra

References

External links
 

2002 films
2000s Malayalam-language films
Malayalam remakes of Tamil films